Likskärhällan is a Swedish island belonging to the Kalix archipelago. The island is part of the Likskär Nature Reserve. It lies to the west of the main island and is named after Likskär. The island has no shore connection and is unbuilt.

References 

Islands of Norrbotten County
Swedish islands in the Baltic